The 1963 Tangerine Bowl was an NCAA College Division game following the 1963 season, between the Western Kentucky Hilltoppers and the Coast Guard Bears. Western Kentucky quarterback Sharon Miller was named the game's most valuable player.

Notable participants
Western Kentucky linebacker Dale Lindsey and running back Jim Burt were selected in the 1965 NFL Draft. Lindsey has subsequently coached at both the college and professional levels, and in December 2012 became the head coach of the San Diego Toreros. Lindsey, Burt, and head coach Nick Denes are inductees of the university's athletic hall of fame.

Coast Guard head coach Otto Graham is an inductee of both the College Football Hall of Fame and the Pro Football Hall of Fame.

Scoring summary

Statistics

References

Further reading
 
  (video)
 

Tangerine Bowl
Citrus Bowl (game)
Coast Guard Bears football bowl games
Western Kentucky Hilltoppers football bowl games
Tangerine Bowl
Tangerine Bowl